Anastasia Sergeyevna Potapova (born 30 March 2001) is a Russian tennis player. 
Potapova has a career-high WTA singles ranking of No. 28, achieved on 27 February 2023 and a doubles ranking of No. 40, reached on 5 December 2022. Potapova is a former junior No. 1, as well as the 2016 Wimbledon Championships girls' singles champion.

Career

Juniors

On the junior tour, Potapova has a career-high junior ranking of 1, achieved in July 2016. Potapova has had large success on the junior tour including a semifinal at the 2016 French Open, quarterfinals at the 2016 Australian Open and the 2015 Wimbledon Championships and doubles finals at the 2015 US Open and the 2016 French Open. Potapova won the 2016 Wimbledon Championships girls' title, defeating Dayana Yastremska in the final. Two of the seven match points in the final set were overturned by challenges. This title made her the No. 1 junior in the world. 

Potapova's other junior highlights include semifinal appearances at the Trofeo Bonfiglio and the Orange Bowl Championships, both Grade A events. Her biggest junior title, excluding Wimbledon, is the Nike Junior International in Roehampton, a Grade 1 event, where she defeated other highly rated junior players such as Claire Liu, Jaimee Fourlis, Sofia Kenin, Olga Danilović and Olesya Pervushina en route to winning the title.

2017: Early rise

Starting her first full year on the tour, Potapova started 2017 unranked as she had only played two professional events entering the year. She defeated rival Amanda Anisimova in the final at an $25k event held in Curitiba. This triumph saw her defeat Teliana Pereira for her first top-200 win, and pushed her into  the top-500 of the rankings for the first time in her career.

She then made her debut at a WTA event, having received a wild card to compete in the qualifying rounds of the Premier Mandatory event in Miami, defeating Maria Sakkari for her first top-100 win before falling to Jana Čepelová in straight sets. A series of good runs on clay saw her reaching two ITF semifinals in succession, most particularly at the Empire Slovak Open where she was just an inch away from reaching the final, losing 5–7 in the final set against Verónica Cepede Royg, who went on to reach the second week at the French Open.

Potapova was handed another wildcard, this time into the qualifying draw of Wimbledon. She pounced on her chances, steering through all her matches in straight sets to make her Grand Slam main draw debut defeating Elizaveta Kulichkovain the last round. However, an untimely fall during her first-round match saw her being forced to retire against Tatjana Maria, ending her impressive run.

It was a bleak stretch of results which followed for Potapova, who reached just one ITF quarterfinal through the remainder of the year. She ended the year ranked 242, with a 20–14 win–loss record and eight top-200 wins.

2018: First WTA singles final & doubles title
Potapova started 2018 with a final appearance at the Sharm El Sheikh $15k event, but was upset by world No. 769, Yuliya Hatouka. She then played in her second WTA Tour main-draw match at the St. Petersburg Trophy, where she finally earned her first main-draw win against Tatjana Maria, in straight sets. This set up a blockbuster second-round match between newly crowned Australian Open champion and world number one, Wozniacki and Potapova, a clash between experience and youth. However, Potapova was only able to claim one game against Wozniacki, falling 0–6, 1–6 to end her run.

Potapova made her Fed Cup debut for Russia, but lost to the higher-ranked Viktória Kužmová and was unable to lead her country to the victory on that weekend. Another ITF final awaited Potapova, this time coming at the O1 Properties Ladies Cup held in Russia. She ousted the 64th-ranked Monica Niculescu but was unable to close out her run as she was defeated by second seed Vera Lapko.

Reaching her first professional clay-court final in Rome, she lost to Dayana Yastremska there having just won one game in the process. 

Potapova was given the chance to participate in yet another WTA event, and entered the Moscow River Cup with the help of a wild card. She defeated two top-100 players and came out of nowhere to make her maiden WTA final, but faltered at the last hurdle as she fell to fellow 17-year-old Olga Danilović in a historic clash between the new generation. She led by a break in the deciding set, but failed to close out the win but still managed to make her top-150 debut with this amazing run. At the same tournament she won her maiden WTA title in doubles with Vera Zvonareva.

Potapova lost in the final round of qualifying at the US Open to Julia Glushko but rebounded to qualify for her third WTA Tour main-draw appearance at the Tashkent Open. She defeated Stefanie Vögele and exacted revenge for her Moscow loss against Olga Danilović in the second round. She then trounced Kateryna Kozlova in the semifinals  to set up an all-Russian final with Margarita Gasparyan, where she was defeated with a one-sided scoreline.

Her season ended with a tough, but encouraging loss to eventual semifinalist and eighth seed Anett Kontaveit in the opening round of the Kremlin Cup despite leading by a break in the final set. Nonetheless, she ended the year inside the top 100 for the first time in her career with a dominating 6–2 win–loss record against top-100 players.

2019: First Grand Slam event match win
Potapova received entry to the main draw of the Australian Open and played her first match against Pauline Parmentier, defeating her in straight sets. This was Potapova's first match win in the main draw of a Grand Slam tournament. In the second round, she was defeated by 17th seed Madison Keys.

She then backed it up with a strong semifinal finish at the Hungarian Ladies Open, beating Sorana Cîrstea in a final-set tiebreak. At the same tournament, she also reached the doubles semifinal alongside Anna Blinkova, but lost to compatriots Ekaterina Alexandrova/Vera Zvonareva in three sets.

After losses in the first qualifying round at the Indian Wells Open and the Miami Open, Potapova returned to help book Russia's spot in the World Group 2 with a vital comeback win over Martina Trevisan. She also partnered Vlada Koval to win the dead doubles rubber.

The Russian earned her first top-20 win over Anastasija Sevastova at the Prague Open and went on to stun world No. 5, Angelique Kerber, in the first round of the French Open.

Potapova won her second career WTA Tour doubles title at the Ladies Open Lausanne with Yana Sizikova and proceeded to reach the semifinals of the Baltic Open where she lost to Sevastova in straight sets.

She lost in the first round of the US Open to Coco Gauff in three sets, before making the second round at the Korea Open where she injured her ankle against Magda Linette.

Potapova ended her season with a first-round loss at the Kremlin Cup to good friend Anna Kalinskaya.

2020: Achieving consistency, major surgery

Potapova started the new season at the Brisbane International where she lost in the final round of qualifying to Yulia Putintseva. Competing at the first edition of the Adelaide International, she was defeated in the final round of qualifying by Arina Rodionova. At the Australian Open, she was defeated in the first round by eighth seed and seven-time champion, Serena Williams.

Coming through qualifying at the St. Petersburg Trophy, Potapova reached the quarterfinals where she lost to second seed, defending champion, and eventual champion Kiki Bertens. At the Abierto Mexicano Telcel, she was defeated in the quarterfinals by qualifier and eventual finalist, Leylah Fernandez. In Monterrey, she made it to the quarterfinals after wins over qualifier Giulia Gatto-Monticone and Tamara Zidanšek. Despite having two match points in the third set, she ended up losing to second seed Johanna Konta.

Potapova didn't play any more tournaments for the rest of the year due to undergoing ankle surgery for her injury sustained at the Korea Open a year earlier. She ended her season ranked 100.

2021: First WTA 1000 quarterfinal
Beginning her 2021 season at the first edition of the Abu Dhabi Open, Potapova lost in the first round to ninth seed Maria Sakkari. At the first edition of the Gippsland Trophy, she was defeated in the second round by top seed Simona Halep. At the Australian Open, she beat 24th seed Alison Riske in the first round. She lost in the third round to tenth seed Serena Williams despite holding multiple set points. After the Australian Open, she competed at the first edition of the Phillip Island Trophy where she was defeated in the first round by 16th seed Rebecca Peterson. However, in doubles, she and Anna Blinkova reached the final where they lost to Ankita Raina/Kamilla Rakhimova.
In Doha, Potapova lost in the second round of qualifying to Jessica Pegula. 

At the Dubai Championships, she beat 11th seed Madison Keys and sixth seed and 2019 champion, Belinda Bencic to reach the quarterfinals of a WTA1000 tournament for the first time in her career. She ended up losing to eventual finalist Barbora Krejčíková. At the Miami Open, she was defeated in the first round by Ajla Tomljanović.

Potapova's first clay-court tournament of the season was at the Charleston Open. She lost in the first round to Anastasija Sevastova. At the İstanbul Cup, she upset sixth seed and compatriot, Anastasia Pavlyuchenkova in a three-set first-round battle. She was defeated in the second round by eventual champion Sorana Cîrstea. In Madrid, she lost in the final round of qualifying to Kristina Mladenovic. At the Italian Open, she was defeated in the final round of qualifying by Bernarda Pera. At the French Open, she lost her first-round match to Leylah Annie Fernandez.

The Russian saved match points against Nina Stojanović in the first round of the Birmingham Classic and reached her second WTA quarterfinal of the year with a comfortable win over Mladenovic. However, she lost to eventual champion Ons Jabeur in straight sets. Potapova was then defeated in the first round of Wimbledon by Donna Vekić.

Potapova qualified for the main draw at the Canadian Open with another win over Mladenovic and stunned Shelby Rogers in the first round. However, she was forced to retire in the second-round due to an injury. She crashed out of the US Open in the first round against 23rd seed Jessica Pegula in straight sets.

At the Ostrava Open, Potapova successfully qualified for the main draw and beat former top-5 player Caroline Garcia, in the first round. She then lost to second seed Petra Kvitová, in three sets. She made her third quarterfinal of the year at the Astana Open, where she defeated Mladenovic for the third time this year.

Her season ended with first-round defeats at the Kremlin Cup against Simona Halep and the Transylvania Open against Tomljanovic once again.

2022: WTA titles & top 50 debut in singles and doubles
Potapova started her season brightly at the Melbourne Summer Set 1, where she reached the quarterfinals but lost to compatriot Veronika Kudermetova in three sets. The Russian was also defeated in the first round of the Australian Open by 30th seed Camila Giorgi. However, she made her first Grand Slam quarterfinal in doubles alongside Rebecca Peterson although they lost to eventual finalists Beatriz Haddad Maia/Anna Danilina despite leading by a set and a break.

She suffered first-round exits at the St. Petersburg Ladies' Trophy, Monterrey Open and the Indian Wells Open, and failure to defend her points from Dubai in 2021 meant that she fell out of the top 100. Nonetheless, she made the doubles semifinals in St. Petersburg with Vera Zvonareva.

Ranked No. 122 at the İstanbul Cup, she won her first WTA title as a qualifier defeating third seed and world No. 29, Veronika Kudermetova. As a result, she returned to the top 80 in the rankings, at world No. 78 on 25 April 2022.

In June, she was suspended for playing at Wimbledon due to the Russian players ban, resulting from the Russian invasion in Ukraine. 

In July, Potapova made to the semifinals of Lausanne Open where she lost in straight sets to Serbian Olga Danilović. Nevertheless, this result guaranteed her a new career high ranking of No. 63. She also made the semifinals of the Hamburg European Open, losing in straight sets to world No. 2, Anett Kontaveit.

Following her showing in the Prague Open final, where she lost to Marie Bouzková, she reached the top 50 at world No. 48, on 1 August 2022. At the same tournament, she won her third doubles title with Yana Sizikova defeating compatriots Angelina Gabueva and Anastasia Zakharova. She reached a career-high ranking of No. 52 in doubles also on 1 August 2022.

2023: Second WTA title & top 35 singles debut
In March 2023, the WTA issued a formal warning to Potapova for wearing a T-shirt of Russian soccer team Spartak Moscow before a match at Indian Wells. Her actions were viewed as a public show of support for her country during its invasion of Ukraine. Potapova said she had supported Spartak since she was 13 and saw no provocation in wearing the shirt. The WTA said what she did was "not acceptable nor an appropriate action".

Performance timelines

Only main-draw results in WTA Tour, Grand Slam tournaments, Fed Cup/Billie Jean King Cup and Olympic Games are included in win–loss records.

Singles
Current after the 2023 ATX Open.

Doubles
Current through the 2023 Australian Open.

WTA career finals

Singles: 5 (2 titles, 3 runner-ups)

Doubles: 4 (3 titles, 1 runner-up)

ITF Circuit finals

Singles: 4 (1 title, 3 runner–ups)

Doubles: 4 (2 titles, 2 runner–ups)

Junior Grand Slam finals

Singles: 1 (title)

Doubles: 3 (3 runner–ups)

Fed Cup/Billie Jean King Cup participation

Singles (1–1)

Doubles (2–0)

WTA Tour career earnings

Record against top 10 players

Potapova's record against players who have been ranked in the top 10. Active players are in boldface.

Top 10 wins

Awards
2016
 The Russian Cup in the nomination Girls Under-18 Team of the Year

Notes

References

External links
 
 
 

2001 births
Living people
Russian female tennis players
Sportspeople from Saratov
People from Khimki
Wimbledon junior champions
Grand Slam (tennis) champions in girls' singles
21st-century Russian women